John de Beauchamp, 2nd Baron Beauchamp of Somerset (4 October 1304 – 19 May 1343) was an English peer and was feudal baron of Hatch Beauchamp in Somerset.

He was born at Stoke-sub-Hamdon, Somersetshire, England, the eldest son and heir of Sir John de Beauchamp, 1st Baron Beauchamp of Somerset (1274–1336), feudal baron of Hatch, by his wife Joan Chenduit.

He married Margaret St John, the daughter of John St John, 1st Baron St John of Basing, Hampshire and his wife Isabel Courtenay. By Margaret, Beauchamp had three sons and three daughters:

John de Beauchamp, 3rd Baron Beauchamp of Somerset (20 January 1329/1330 – 8 October 1361), who married Alice Beauchamp
Edward de Beauchamp (born c. 1330)
William de Beauchamp (born c. 1331)
Eleanor de Beauchamp (c. 1327 – 13 June 1391), who married three times: to John Blount, John de Meriet and Henry Lunet
Cicely de Beauchamp (c. 1321 – 7 June 1394) who inherited the manors of Hatch Beauchamp, Shepton Beauchamp, Merryfield, Ilton and one third of the manor of Shepton Mallet, Somerset, the manors of Boultbery and Haberton, Devon, of Dorton, Buckinghamshire, and of Little Haw, Suffolk. She married twice: to Sir Roger St. Maur (alias Seymour), and on 14 September 1368, to Sir Richard Tuberville (or Sir Gilbert Turberville) of Coity Castle, Glamorgan.
Margaret de Beauchamp (born c. 1326)

External links
 Calendar of Inquisitions Post Mortem – IPM of John de Beauchamp

References
Notes

Sources
familysearch.org Accessed February 21, 2009
thepeerage.com Accessed February 21, 2009

14th-century English people
1304 births
1343 deaths
People from Somerset
Barons in the Peerage of England
John